2433 Sootiyo, provisional designation , is a stony asteroid from the middle region of the asteroid belt, approximately 13 kilometers in diameter. It was discovered on 5 April 1981, by American astronomer Edward Bowell at Lowell's Anderson Mesa Station near Flagstaff, Arizona. The asteroid was named "Sootiya" meaning "star boy" in the Hopi language.

Orbit and classification 

Sootiyo orbits the Sun in the central main-belt at a distance of 2.0–3.2 AU once every 4 years and 3 months (1,537 days). Its orbit has an eccentricity of 0.22 and an inclination of 10° with respect to the ecliptic. The first used precovery was taken at Palomar Observatory in 1953, extending the asteroid's observation arc by 28 years prior to its discovery observation.

Physical characteristics 

PanSTARRS photometric survey characterized Sootiyo as a LS-type, an intermediary between the stony S-type and rare L-type asteroids.

Rotation period 

French amateur astronomer René Roy obtained a rotational lightcurve from photometric observations in October 2007. It gave a rotation period of  hours with a brightness variation of 0.54 magnitude, superseding observations by Brazilian Cláudia Angeli and by the Spanish ECLA project, which both gave a period of 7 hours with an amplitude of 0.57 and 0.4 magnitude, respectively.

Diameter and albedo 

According to the survey carried out by the Japanese Akari satellite, the asteroid measures 14.9 kilometers in diameter and its surface has an albedo of 0.156, while two different data sets from NASA's Wide-field Infrared Survey Explorer with its subsequent NEOWISE mission give a diameter of 12.1 and 12.9 kilometers with an albedo of 0.269 and 0.304, respectively.

The Collaborative Asteroid Lightcurve Link agrees with the results obtained by Akari, assuming a standard albedo for stony asteroids of 0.20 and calculating a diameter of 14.9 kilometers with an absolute magnitude of 11.5.

Naming 

This minor planet is named "Sootiya" which means "star boy" in the language of the Hopi Tribe of northern Arizona. Correspondingly, the Vestian asteroid 2432 Soomana stands for "star girl". Naming citation was proposed by Michael Lomatewama and Ekkehart Malotki and published on 8 February 1982.

Notes

References

External links 
 Asteroid Lightcurve Database (LCDB), query form (info )
 Dictionary of Minor Planet Names, Google books
 Asteroids and comets rotation curves, CdR – Observatoire de Genève, Raoul Behrend
 Discovery Circumstances: Numbered Minor Planets (1)-(5000) – Minor Planet Center
 
 

002433
Discoveries by Edward L. G. Bowell
Named minor planets
19810405